The 1968 United States presidential election in New York took place on November 5, 1968. All 50 states and the District of Columbia, were part of the 1968 United States presidential election. Voters chose 43 electors to the Electoral College, which selected the president and vice president. New York was won by incumbent Democratic vice president Hubert Humphrey, defeating Republican former vice president Richard Nixon by a margin of 5.46 percentage points and more than 370,000 votes. Maine Senator Edmund Muskie was Humphrey’s vice-presidential running mate, while Nixon’s running mate was Maryland Governor Spiro Agnew.

Humphrey took 49.76% of the vote to Nixon's 44.30% in New York, while former (and future) Alabama Governor George Wallace won 5.29% as the nominee of the American Independent Party. Wallace ran a populist, mostly Southern-oriented candidate which failed to gain traction in the northeast. He did best in suburban and exurban counties around New York. Wallace's pro-segregation stance was popular with voters who resented the increasing influence of African-Americans in the national Democratic Party; however, in the inner cities and upstate counties, his views were seen as repugnant.

New York weighed in for this election as 7% more Democratic than the national average. The presidential election of 1968 was a very multi-partisan election for New York, with almost six percent of the electorate voting for third Parties. In typical form for the time, the highly populated centers of New York City, Buffalo, and Albany, voted Democratic, while the smaller counties in New York turned out for Nixon as the Republican candidate. Nixon thus became the first Republican to win the White House without carrying Erie County since Abraham Lincoln in 1864, the first to do so without carrying Niagara or Schenectady Counties since Rutherford B. Hayes in 1876, as well as the first to do so without carrying Albany or Queens Counties since Herbert Hoover in 1928.

Despite Nixon winning most of the state's counties, Humphrey’s landslide margins in massively-populated New York City — receiving 60.6% of the vote in the five boroughs to Nixon's 33.9% — provided him with a statewide victory. Humphrey was seen by many as promising to continue the reformist legacy of president Lyndon B. Johnson, and this garnered him strong support by liberal voters across America. 

This was the first time since Samuel J. Tilden won the state in 1876 that New York voted for a losing Democratic candidate. , this remains the last time that New York had the largest number of electoral votes in the nation. Nixon is one of four presidents to lose his home state on a successful presidential bid, the others being James K. Polk, Woodrow Wilson, and Donald Trump.

Results

Results by county

See also
 United States presidential elections in New York
 1968 Democratic National Convention
 Civil Rights Movement
 Presidency of Richard Nixon
 Watergate Scandal
 Vietnam War

Notes

References

New York
1968
1968 New York (state) elections